Ajina (born April 13, 1994 in Kentucky) is an American Champion Thoroughbred racehorse.

Background
Bred by renowned horseman Allen E. Paulson, Ajina was purchased by Janice and Robert McNair's Stonerside Stable of Paris, Kentucky.

Ajina was out of the mare Winglet, a daughter of U.S. Racing Hall of Fame inductee Alydar. She was sired by Strawberry Road, a winner of important Group One races in Australia and the 1983 Australian Champion Racehorse of the Year.

Racing career
Sent to the track at age two by trainer Bill Mott, in her four starts Ajina won a maiden race plus the 1996 Tempted and Demoiselle Stakes. In her only other start, she ran second. At age three, the filly started nine times, finishing third twice and running second in the 1997 Alabama and Beldame Stakes. Ridden by Mike E. Smith, Ajina won the Coaching Club American Oaks and Mother Goose Stakes then scored the most important win of her racing career at Hollywood Park Racetrack by capturing the Breeders' Cup Distaff. Her performances in 1997 earned her that year's American Champion 3-Year-Old Filly honors.

Ajina raced four times at age four, winning the 1998 Pimlico Breeders' Cup Distaff Handicap but finishing off the board in her other three starts.

Stud career
She was then retired to broodmare duty at Stonerside Stable in Paris, Kentucky where she has produced six foals.

References
 Ajina's pedigree and racing stats
 Ajina at Stonerside Stable

1994 racehorse births
Racehorses bred in Kentucky
Racehorses trained in the United States
Breeders' Cup Distaff winners
Eclipse Award winners
Thoroughbred family 13-c